Raymond Bowden (1 September 1903 – c. 1969) was a rugby union player who represented Australia. He played in the lock position.

Bowden was born in Walcha, New South Wales and claimed 1 international rugby cap for Australia.

References

Australian rugby union players
Australia international rugby union players
1903 births
1969 deaths
Rugby union players from New South Wales
Rugby union locks